Autochloris is a genus of moths in the subfamily Arctiinae.

Species
Species :
 Autochloris almon (Cramer, [1779])
 Autochloris aroa (Schaus, 1894)
 Autochloris bijuncta (Walker, 1856)
 Autochloris buchwaldi Rothschild, 1931
 Autochloris caunus (Cramer, [1779])
 Autochloris cincta (Schaus, 1905)
 Autochloris collocata (Walker, [1865])
 Autochloris completa (Walker, 1854)
 Autochloris crinopoda Kaye, 1918
 Autochloris cuma (Druce, 1897)
 Autochloris ectomelaena (Hampson, 1898)
 Autochloris enagrus (Cramer, [1779])
 Autochloris ethela Schaus, 1924
 Autochloris flavicosta Rothschild, 1931
 Autochloris flavipes Draudt, 1915
 Autochloris flavosignata Rothschild, 1931
 Autochloris jansonis (Butler, 1872)
 Autochloris laennus (Walker, 1854)
 Autochloris magnifica Rothschild, 1931
 Autochloris mathani Rothschild, 1911
 Autochloris nigridior Rothschild, 1931
 Autochloris patagiata Dyar, 1909
 Autochloris proterva Draudt, 1915
 Autochloris quadrimacula Dognin, 1923
 Autochloris serra (Schaus, 1892)
 Autochloris simplex (Walker, 1856)
 Autochloris simulans (Druce, 1909)
 Autochloris solimoes Schaus, 1924
 Autochloris suffumata Draudt, 1915
 Autochloris trinitatis Rothschild
 Autochloris umbratus Fleming, 1950
 Autochloris vetusta Zerny, 1931
 Autochloris vitristriga (Druce, 1897)
 Autochloris whitelyi (Druce, 1883)
 Autochloris xanthogastroides (Schaus, 1901)
 Autochloris xenedorus (Druce, 1884)

References

Arctiinae
Taxa named by Jacob Hübner
Moth genera